Fuhai County is a county under the jurisdiction of the Altay Region of the Xinjiang Uygur Autonomous Region of the People's Republic of China, located in the lower reaches of the Ulungu River in northern Xinjiang.

History 
From about the 12th to the 7th century BC, the Scythians nomadic in the area. From the 7th to the 3rd century before, this place was the territory of Hujie State. In 176 BC, the Huns conquered the Hujie Kingdom, which was the territory of the Hujie King in the right part of the Huns. In 48 AD, the Xiongnu was divided into two parts, the north and the south, and this place belonged to the territory of King Huyan of the North Huns. From the 3rd to the 4th century AD, it was the land of Hud. In the 5th century AD, Rouran was strong and prosperous, and it was called Rouran annexation.

In 552, Ashina Tumen defeated Rouran and established the Turkic Khanate. In 583, the Turkic Khanate was divided into two parts, the east and the west, which belonged to the Western Turkic Khanate. In 605, the Tiele Khanate was established, and this place was the territory of Yexi Khan, the leader of Xueyantuo, the deputy Khan of the Khanate. Around 620, the Shekui Khan of the Western Turks expelled Xue Yantuo from the Ulungu River Basin. In 658, Tang defeated the Western Turkic Khanate, and this place was under the jurisdiction of Jinshan Protectorate. In 702, the Tang Dynasty established the Beiting Protectorate, which was still nomadic by the Turkic tribes, under the jurisdiction of the Beiting Protectorate. In 757, the Huihe Khanate sent troops to help the Tang Dynasty to pacify the Anshi Rebellion, and its clan power gradually spread to the west of Jinshan. In 790, Tibetan Empire captured Beiting Protectorate. The following year, the Huihe Khanate recovered Beiting, and this place was changed to belong to the Huihe Khanate.

In the late Liao Dynasty, this place was the nomadic land of the Turkic Naiman tribe. The Jin Dynasty destroyed the Liao Dynasty, and Yelu Dashi, a nobleman of the Liao Dynasty, moved westward to Central Asia, and established the Western Liao Dynasty in 1130. In 1205, the Mongolian conquered the Naiman tribe and killed its leader, Taiyang Khan. This place is the territory of Okuotai Khan. In 1251, the province of Bishi Balihang Shangshu was established, and this place was changed to the jurisdiction of the province.

In 1341, Chagatai Khan annexed the territory of Okuotai Khan, which was changed to Chagatai Khanate. After the Chagatai Khanate was split, this place belonged to the Eastern Chagatai Khanate. The Mongolian Waja Department was strong and expanded westward. The Waja people were nomads here. Among them, the Junggar tribe nomadic in the Ili River basin, and the Duerbot tribe nomadic in the Irtysh River basin. Because the leader of the Junggar tribe is the leader of the four tribes, Galdan, also known as "Khan", established the Junggar Khanate.

In 1757, the Qing Dynasty defeated the Dzungar, and this place belonged to the Qing Dynasty. In 1762, this place was placed under the jurisdiction of the Minister Counselor Kobudo, who was under the deputy general of Dingbian Zuo in Uliasutai. In 1867, it was under the jurisdiction of the Minister of Maritime Affairs of Brento. In 1869, the Minister of Brentuohai was abolished, and it was still under the jurisdiction of the Minister of Counsellor Cobdo. In 1903, the Qing court set up the Brentuohai Bureau. In 1906, the Qing court divided Kebudo and Altai, and the county was subordinate to the minister of Altai. The area under the jurisdiction of the Minister of Altai Affairs is directly under the central government.

In 1912, under the Office of the Chief Executive of Altai. In 1914, the Brentuohai Civil Affairs Branch was established. In 1919, the Altai Special Administrative Region was placed under the jurisdiction of Xinjiang Province, and Asan Dao was set up to govern the county; in the same year, Brentuohai County was set up. In 1921, Brentohai County was upgraded to a county, under the administrative office of Ashan. In 1942, Brentohai County was renamed Fuhai County. After 1949, it was subordinate to the Ashan Administrative Commissioner's Office in Xinjiang Province. In 1955, it was attached to the Administrative Commissioner's Office of the Altay Region, Ihasak Autonomous Prefecture, Xinjiang Uygur Autonomous Region.

Geography and Climate 

Fuhai County is located in the middle of the Altay region of Xinjiang Uygur Autonomous Region, adjacent to Fuyun County in the east, Jimunai County, Tacheng District, and Buxel Mongolia Autonomous County in the west, across the Junggar Basin in the south and adjacent to Fukang City, Changji Hui Autonomous Prefecture, and adjacent to Altay in the north. City, Beitun City, the northernmost border with Mongolia.

The Altai Mountains traverses Fuhai County, and the two main rivers in the county are the Ulungu Lake and the Irtysh River. Ulungu Lake is located in Fuhai County. The county's elevation ranges from 386 to 3,332 m (1,266 to 10,932 ft), with an average elevation of about 500 m (1,640 ft).

Fuhai County has a mid-temperate continental arid climate, with an average annual temperature of 4.7 °C (40.5 °F), extreme high temperature of 40.0 °C (104 °F), and extreme low temperature of −42.7 °C (−45 °F). In Fuhai County, there are 224 days in a year when the temperature exceeds 0 °C, the average annual frost-free period is 156 days (the longest is 186 days, and the shortest is 122 days), the average annual sunshine is 2908 hours, and the average annual precipitation is about 131 mm.

Fuhai County has listed 15 species of rare and endangered first-class protected animals in China, including wild donkeys, saiga antelopes, snow leopards, beavers, red-crowned cranes, and Mongolian wild horses; second-class protected animals include red deer, argali, lynx, swans, and ibex 20 other species; hundreds of other wild animals. There are more than 1,000 kinds of wild plants, including more than 200 kinds of medicinal plants, which are widely distributed. Licorice, Codonopsis, Dayun, Fritillaria, Coptidis, Cordyceps sinensis, Asafoetida, mushrooms, etc. The rare and endangered protected plants in the autonomous region include Siberian fir, spruce, Populus euphratica, snow lotus, etc.

Administrative divisions
Fuhai County is directed divided into three towns, three townships, one township-level farm, one prison, and a number of areas administered by the Xinjiang Production and Construction Corps.

Towns 

Townships 

Prefecture Farm 1 
, a special township-level unit, is located in Fuhai County.

Fuhai Prison 
Fuhai Prison is a township-level prison located in Fuhai County.

Xinjiang Production and Construction Corps 

Demographics 

Fuhai County is an ethnically diverse county home to 32 different ethnic groups. Ethnic Kazakhs and Han Chinese peoples both comprise large pluralities of the county's population, accounting for 48.25% and 45.65% of the county's population, respectively. Fuhai County also has sizable Hui and Uyghur populations.

Economy 
Fuhai County has 1.2 million acres of cultivated land and 23 million acres of grassland, and is the home of the Altay Sheep. In 2013, the county was named the camel milk capital of China. Aquaculture is also present in the county, particularly in Ulungur Lake.

The county is home to a number of natural resources, including oil, natural gas, iron ore, spodumene. The county's proven natural gas reserves total 105.3 billion cubic meters, and the county's oil reserves are more than 11 million tons. Geologic surveys exploring the county's copper, lead, zinc, gold, beryllium, lithium, niobium, tantalum, rubidium, cesium, and muscovite have been conducted. Clay has also been mined in Fuhai County since the 1980s.

Hongshanzui Port, a land border crossing with Mongolia, is located within Fuhai County. The county government has announced efforts to improve the crossing's poor infrastructure in order to expand commerce through the crossing.

Transportation 
China National Highway 216 and China National Highway 218 both run through the county. Xinjiang Provincial Highway 318 and Xinjiang Provincial Highway 324 also run through the county.

The Kuytun–Beitun railway passes through Fuhai County.

Culture 
Kazakh culture is prevalent in Fuhai County due to its large Kazakh population, particularly Kazakh dastans, Kazakh embroidery, Kazakh yurts, and a number of horse-related traditions unique to Kazakh culture.

Starting in 1988, the county government began undertaking research regarding dastans in the hope of preserving them. In 1992, the county government archived four volumes of dastans, totaling 340,000 words.

References 

County-level divisions of Xinjiang
Altay Prefecture